General Shoup may refer to:

 Francis Asbury Shoup, Confederate general in the American Civil War
 David M. Shoup, U.S. Marine Corps. general